Geghanist is a village in the Artik Municipality of the Shirak Province of Armenia. The town's church dates from 1852. The Statistical Committee of Armenia reported its population was 1,277 in 2010, up from 1,150 at the 2001 census.

Demographics

References 

Communities in Shirak Province
Populated places in Shirak Province